Terrence Edward Fox (born July 31, 1935) is an  American former right-handed Major League Baseball relief pitcher/closer who played seven MLB seasons from 1960 to 1966 for the Milwaukee Braves, Detroit Tigers and Philadelphia Phillies.

Fox played at Thornton Township High School in Harvey, Illinois, graduating in 1953. The New Iberia Pelicans (or Indians) of the Evangeline League sent Fox to the Braves in an unknown transaction. He made his big league debut for the Braves on September 4, 1960 at the age of 25 and wearing the number 36, pitching two-thirds of an inning against the Cincinnati Reds. He gave up one hit and walked a batter, but came away otherwise unscathed. He ended up pitching in a total of 5 games for the Braves in his rookie season, posting a 4.32 ERA.

He was traded along with Dick Brown, Bill Bruton and Chuck Cottier from the Braves to the Tigers for Frank Bolling and Neil Chrisley. The Tigers would end up getting the better of the deal—although Cottier didn't amount to much with Detroit, Brown and Bruton both had the best seasons of their careers when it came to home run output, but the real gem of the trade was Fox himself.

In his first two seasons with the Tigers, he led all pitchers on the team with over 20 appearances in ERA each season with marks of 1.41 and 1.71. Also their main closer those two years, he posted save marks of 12 and 16. His 12 put him at fifth most in the league in 1961, while his 16 put him at third most in the league in 1962. One interesting note about his 1961 season is that he surrendered Roger Maris' 58th home run of that year. Here is the tale, according to BaseballLibrary.com:

He again led his team in saves with 11 in 1963, and also posted a respectable 3.59 ERA. He was not the team's leading save-getter in 1964, finishing third on the team with 5 saves. He trailed both Larry Sherry (11) and Fred Gladding (7). His ERA was 3.39.

He was again the team's leading closer in 1965, collecting 10 saves. He also posted a 2.78 ERA, which tied him for second among all relievers who had over 20 appearances on the team.

His career took a total turn-for-the-worse in 1966. He started the season off with the Tigers, but after posting a 6.30 ERA in the first four games of the season, he parted from them after being sold to the Phillies. In his final 36 games with them that season, he posted a 4.47 ERA. He ended his big league career on September 25, 1966. While with the Tigers he wore number 18. In his short time with the Phillies, he wore 34 and 19. While with the Phillies, he earned $19,000.

Overall, he went 29–19 in his career with 59 saves and a 2.99 ERA. As a batter, he struck out in 40 of his 65 career at-bats, batting just .123 (3 of his 8 career hits were for extra-bases, though). He committed 7 errors in his career for a .942 fielding percentage.

Baseball-Reference.com says his career statistics are most similar to those of Minnie Rojas and Chuck Taylor.

Fox has lived in New Iberia, Louisiana.

See also
Best pitching seasons by a Detroit Tiger

References

External links

Terry Fox at Baseball Almanac
Terry Fox at Baseball Gauge

1935 births
Living people
Atlanta Crackers players
Austin Senators players
Baseball players from Chicago
Denver Bears players
Detroit Tigers players
Jacksonville Braves players
Knoxville Smokies players
Major League Baseball pitchers
Milwaukee Braves players
New Iberia Pelicans players
Philadelphia Phillies players
Sacramento Solons players
San Diego Padres (minor league) players
Topeka Hawks players